New Hampshire Route 150 (abbreviated NH 150) is a  north–south state highway in Rockingham County in southeastern New Hampshire, United States.

Route description

The road runs from Kensington south to the Massachusetts border.

The southern terminus of NH 150 is at the Massachusetts state line in South Hampton, where the road continues south as Massachusetts Route 150 in the town of Amesbury. The northern terminus of NH 150 is at New Hampshire Route 108 in Kensington. For most of its length, NH 150 is named Amesbury Road.

Major intersections

In popular culture
NH 150 in Kensington, near where it intersects with Brewer Road, was the location of the Exeter incident, a highly publicized UFO sighting that occurred on September 3, 1965.

See also

 List of state highways in New Hampshire

References

External links

 New Hampshire State Route 150 on Flickr

150
Transportation in Rockingham County, New Hampshire